1995 heat wave may refer to:
1995 Chicago heat wave (July)
1995 British Isles heat wave (July–August)